Sheena Porter (born 1935) is a British author of children's novels. She won the 1964 Carnegie Medal from the Library Association, recognising Nordy Bank as the year's best children's book by a British subject.

Sheena Porter has worked as a librarian in Leicester, Nottingham and Shropshire, and currently lives in Ludlow.

Her work is particularly notable for its atmosphere and characterization. It has a feeling for landscape, often portraying actual places, especially in the high country of the Welsh Marches, such as Nordy Bank, and the Long Mynd in The Knockers. She also weaves the history and folklore of the region into her narratives.

Selected works
 
The Bronze Chrysanthemum (1961), illustrated by Shirley Hughes
Hills and Hollows (1962), illus. Victor Ambrus
Jacobs' Ladder (1963), illus. Ambrus
Nordy Bank (1964), illus. Annette Macarthur-Onslow
The Knockers (1965), illus. Gareth Floyd
Deerfold (1966), illus. Ambrus
The Scapegoat (1968), illus. Doreen Roberts
The Valley of Carrig-Wen (1971), illus. Roberts
The Hospital (1973), illus. Robin Jacques

References

External links

    
 

 

British children's writers
Carnegie Medal in Literature winners
Writers from Ludlow
1935 births
Living people
Date of birth missing (living people)
Place of birth missing (living people)